Naredi is a small settlement on the Rute Plateau in the hills west of Velike Lašče in central Slovenia. The entire Municipality of Velike Lašče is part of the traditional region of Lower Carniola. It is now included in the Central Slovenia Statistical Region.

References

External links

Naredi on Geopedia

Populated places in the Municipality of Velike Lašče